Massacre is a 1956 American-Mexican Western film directed by Louis King and starring Dane Clark, James Craig, and Martha Roth.

It was known as Charge of the Rurales.

Plot
A tribe of hostile Indian goes on the warpath slaughtering white men with guns sold to them by mercenary outlaws.

Cast
 Dane Clark as Capitán Ramón
 James Craig as Teniente Ezparza
 Martha Roth as Angélica Chávez
 Miguel Torruco as Miguel Chávez
 Jaime Fernández as Juan Pedro (as Jamie Fernandez)
 José Ángel Espinosa 'Ferrusquilla' as Vincent (as Ferrusquilla)
 Enrique Zambrano as Munez
 José Muñoz as Macario 
 José Pulido as Self

Production
The film was shot in Mexico.

References

External links
 
 
 

1956 films
American Western (genre) films
Films directed by Louis King
1956 Western (genre) films
Films shot in Mexico
20th Century Fox films
Lippert Pictures films
1950s English-language films
1950s American films